Callum Chambers (born 19 November 1979) is an Australian rules footballer who has played in the Australian Football League.

He was recruited as the number 13 draft pick in the 1997 AFL Draft from Lucknow,  Victoria. Callum made his debut for the West Coast Eagles in Round 10, 2000 against Hawthorn.

He was a very skilled and essential player for the club while they were struggling at the bottom of the ladder during the 2001–02 seasons. However, as the Eagles' midfield was flooded with new talent, he struggled to make an impact and be selected for games on a consistent basis.

During this period, he played many games in the WAFL; initially for West Coast's WAFL-affiliate, East Perth (2000–01); and then (after that affiliation ended) with West Perth (2002–04). He won a WAFL premiership at each club, in 2000 and 2003 respectively.

Chambers was traded to the Carlton Football Club at the end of the 2004 season. There was much hype surrounding Callum at the club, as he was the fastest player over long distances in the history of the club, dashing long-distance records in trials. He showed glimpses of brilliance as he helped the team to win the 2005 Pre-Season premiership. However, his form faded away fast in the main season struggled to have much impact at AFL level, playing most of his 2006 for the Northern Bullants seniors. He was delisted at the end of the 2006 season.

From 2007 until 2010, Chambers returned to the West Perth Football Club. In 2008, Chambers played an excellent season, and finished second for the Sandover Medal, two votes behind Peel's Hayden Ballantyne. In 2011, Chambers moved to the Cervantes Football Club in the Central Midlands Coastal Football League; he remains there as of 2015, and won premierships with the club in 2011, 2012 and 2013.

References

External links
Callum Chambers at the Carlton Football Club website

Callum Chambers profile in Blueseum

1979 births
Carlton Football Club players
Living people
West Coast Eagles players
East Perth Football Club players
West Perth Football Club players
Preston Football Club (VFA) players
Australian rules footballers from Victoria (Australia)
Gippsland Power players